The Seven-headed Serpent (from Sumerian muš-saĝ-7: snake with seven heads) in Sumerian religion was one of the Heroes slain by Ninurta, patron god of Lagash, in ancient Iraq. Its body was hung on the "shining cross-beam" of Ninurta's chariot (lines 55–63).

See also
Anzu, a great bird whose death was sometimes credited to Ninurta
Bashmu, a possibly identical serpent slain by Ninurta
Dragon, a beast slain by Ninurta
Mushmahhu
Nehushtan
Ushumgallu, the great dragon
 Lernaean Hydra
 The Seven-headed Serpent, a Greek fairy tale of the same name

References

Legendary serpents
Mesopotamian legendary creatures
Mythical many-headed creatures
7 (number)